Euphorbia boissieri is a species of plant in the family Euphorbiaceae. It is endemic to Madagascar.  Its natural habitat is subtropical or tropical moist lowland forests. It is threatened by habitat loss. A political crisis in 2009 also plunged Madagascar wildlife into a desperate state.   It is named after botanist Pierre Edmond Boissier.

References

Endemic flora of Madagascar
boissieri
Vulnerable plants
Geography of Madagascar
Taxonomy articles created by Polbot
Taxa named by Henri Ernest Baillon